The 1989 Everest World Matchplay was a professional non-ranking snooker tournament that took place in 7 to 16 December 1989 in Brentwood, England with ITV showing television coverage from 9 December.
  
The matches had now been expanded to 17 frame matches up to the sem-final and the final, a 35 frame, four session match as in the World Championship and Jimmy White won the event, defeating John Parrott 18–9 in the final.

Stephen Hendry got the highest break of the championship with 129. He received £10,000 in prize money.

Main draw

References

World Matchplay
World Matchplay
World Matchplay
1989